Social care in Scotland encompasses social work; care home services in the community for adults, children and young people; and services for young children, including nurseries and after-school care clubs.

National Care Service
The National Care Service (Scotland) Bill was published in June 2022. It would allow Scottish Ministers to transfer social care responsibility from local authorities to a new, national service.

Workforce
 there are approximately 203,200 people employed within social services in the country.

Older people
A community building project, Older People for Older People, resulted in a film being made in 2010 about how older people's skills were used in Ardersier to assist other older people.

Criminal justice
There is no probation service in Scotland. The equivalent function is carried out by criminal justice social workers, who are part of local authorities’ social work departments. Criminal justice social workers follow the same entry procedure as other social workers.

Housing
The University of Stirling, Housing Options Scotland and Horizon Housing Association conducted a study of allocations and lettings practice for accessible and adapted social housing in 2018.  They found that most of the 28 disabled home-seekers in their study received inappropriate housing offers, or no offers at all.

See also 
 Care Inspectorate
 Children's hearing system
 Cornerstone Community Care
 Criminal Justice Social Work Services
 Education in Scotland
 Health and Social Care Directorates
 Healthcare in Scotland
 Local government in Scotland
 NHS Scotland
 Quarriers
 Scotland's Commissioner for Children and Young People
 Scots law
 Scottish Children's Reporter Administration
 Scottish Social Services Council

References

Further reading

External links 
 Staff of Scottish Local Authority Social Work Services, 2010, Scottish Government

 
Probation
Scottish criminal law